Belalora striatula is a species of sea snail, a marine gastropod mollusk in the family Mangeliidae.

Description
The length of the shell attains 5 mm.

Distribution
This marine species occurs off the South Shetland Islands and the Penguin Island, Antarctica, Antarctic Ocean

References

External links
 Die antarktischen Schnecken und Muscheln, In: Deutsche Südpolar-Expedition 1901-1903 (Erich von Drygalski, E.v. ed.), vol. 8, No. 5, Georg Reimer, Berlin.
 Kantor Y.I., Harasewych M.G. & Puillandre N. (2016). A critical review of Antarctic Conoidea (Neogastropoda). Molluscan Research. 36(3): 153–206
 
 
 Kantor Y.I., Harasewych M.G. & Puillandre N. (2016). A critical review of Antarctic Conoidea (Neogastropoda). Molluscan Research. 36(3): 153–206

striatula
Gastropods described in 1912